Why the Long Face may refer to:

 Why the Long Face (album), 1995 album by Big Country
 "Why the Long Face" (song), 2003 song by Manitoba/Caribou